Tuomo Arto Mikael Karila (born 7 April 1968) is a Finnish former Olympic wrestler. He was born in Helsinki, Uusimaa, Finland. His nickname is Tuoppi.

Wrestling career
His sports club was Vantaan Sampo, in Vantaa, in Finland.

In 1986, he won the Minnesota high school Class A 155-pound wrestling title as an 18-year-old exchange student at Canby High School, after a  29-3-1 season wrestling in three different weight classes.

He won silver medals at the 1990 and 1991 European Championships at 74.0 kg. in Greco-Roman wrestling.

Karila competed for Finland at the 1992 Summer Olympics in Barcelona, at the age of 24, in Wrestling--Men's Welterweight (74 kg), Greco-Roman.

He won a silver medal at the 1994 World Wrestling Championships at 82.0 kg. in Greco-Roman wrestling.

Karila competed for Finland at the 1996 Summer Olympics in Atlanta at the age of 28, in Wrestling--Men's Middleweight (82 kg), Greco-Roman, and came in 11th.

References

External links
 

Sportspeople from Helsinki
Olympic wrestlers of Finland
Wrestlers at the 1992 Summer Olympics
1968 births
Finnish male sport wrestlers
Wrestlers at the 1996 Summer Olympics
Living people
20th-century Finnish people
21st-century Finnish people
World Wrestling Championships medalists